USRC Wolcott, the second ship of the name, sometimes referred to as USRC Oliver Wolcott, was a revenue cutter in commission in the United States Revenue-Marine from 1873 to 1894 and in the United States Revenue Cutter Service from 1894 to 1897. She served in the waters of the Territory of Alaska during her career. After her revenue cutter service, she operated as a merchant vessel until she was wrecked in 1900.

Construction and commissioning
Wolcott was built by Risden Iron Works at San Francisco, California. She was constructed of white oak and yellow fir brought to San Francisco from Oregon and Washington, and was schooner-rigged with iron-wire standing rigging. She had a vertical-cylinder, surface-condensing steam engine. Revenue Captain White accepted her for service on behalf of the U.S. Revenue-Marine on 3 July 1873, and she entered service on 30 July 1873 when the crew of the revenue cutter , which she replaced, cross-decked from Wayanda to her.

Service history

Revenue cutter
Home-ported at Port Townsend, Washington, Wolcott was assigned to the Bering Sea Patrol and spent most of her career operating in the waters of the Territory of Alaska. Her crew deserted in 1882, apparently because of low wages, her commanding officer, Revenue Captain L. N. Stodder having orders not to allow wages for her crew to exceed $40 per month. Re-manned, she arrived at the request of authorities in British Columbia, Canada, at Port Simpson, British Columbia, in 1883 to guard against a feared uprising by Native Americans there.

The U.S. Revenue-Marine was renamed the U.S. Revenue Cutter Service in 1894. Late in Wolcotts career, she rescued the survivors of the schooner Elwood at Killisnoo in Southeast Alaska. Elwood had been wrecked on a reef off Gardner Point on 14 December 1895 with the loss of one life, and her survivors made a journey via Murder Cove on the southernmost coast of Admiralty Island in the Alexander Archipelago in order to reach Killisnoo. Wolcott transported them to Sitka.

Wolcott was sold to Joshua Green of Seattle, Washington, for $3,050 on 19 February 1897.

Commercial service
After her sale, Wolcott retained her name and entered service as a merchant vessel. As of 1899 her home port was San Francisco.

Wolcotts last voyage ended in Alaskan waters. All on board reached safety and the gold bullion was salvaged, but Wolcott became a total loss. Valued at $15,000 at the time of her loss, she was insured for $12,500.

References

Schooners of the United States
Ships of the United States Revenue Cutter Service
Ships built in San Francisco
1873 ships
Shipwrecks of the Alaska coast
Maritime incidents in 1900